Anne Maxwell may refer to:

Anne Fitzalan-Howard, Duchess of Norfolk (1927–2013), née Anne Maxwell
Ann Maxwell (born 1944), author

See also
Maxwell (surname)